HMS Panther was a B-class torpedo boat destroyer of the British Royal Navy. She was completed by Laird, Son & Company, Birkenhead, in 1897.

Design and construction
Panther was ordered on 9 January 1896 as one of six 30-knotter destroyers programmed to be built by Lairds under the 1895–1896 shipbuilding programme for the Royal Navy. These followed on from four very similar destroyers ordered from Lairds as part of the 1894–1895 programme.

Displacement was  light and  full load.

Armament was the standard for the 30-knotters, i.e. a QF 12 pounder 12 cwt ( calibre) gun on a platform on the ship's conning tower (in practice the platform was also used as the ship's bridge), with a secondary armament of five 6-pounder guns, and two 18-inch (450 mm) torpedo tubes. The ship had a crew of 63 officers and men.

Panther was laid down at Laird's Birkenhead shipyard as Yard number 624 on 19 May 1896 and was launched on 21 January 1897. She reached  during sea trials. and was completed in January 1898.

Service history
In July–August 1900, Panther took part in that year's Royal Navy Annual Manoeuvres. On 20 April 1901 she was commissioned at Devonport by Lieutenant and Commander A. K. Macrorie to take the place of HMS Osprey in the dockyard's instructional flotilla. In July–August 1901, she again took part in the annual manoeuvres. In early December 1901 Commander Cecil Lambert was appointed in command, as she was recommissioned as tender to the battleship Illustrious on the Mediterranean station. Lambert was moved to another ship the following month, however, and when she left Devonport for Malta in January 1902, Lieutenant and Commander Lancelot Napier Turton was in command. She visited Lemnos in August 1902. On 27 October 1904, Panther collided with the destroyer . Both destroyers were damaged and had to return to Malta for repair. Panther returned to British waters in 1906.

In August 1906, Panther replaced  in the 2nd Destroyer Flotilla when Orwell was refitted. In August 1907,Panther, now a member of the 4th Destroyer Flotilla, was (along with fellow flotilla members  and ) having defects rectified at Sheerness Dockyard. By December 1908, Panther was part of the Eastern Group of destroyers, based at Harwich. She started a refit at Sheerness that month, which was completed by March, when she returned to Harwich to rejoin what had been renamed the 1st Destroyer Flotilla, although she was due to be replaced by the Tribal-class destroyer . This happened at the end of June that year, with Panther being the last "Thirty-Knotter" in service with the 1st Flotilla. In August 1910, Panther, now part of the Nore flotilla, was refitted at Chatham Dockyard.  In October 1911, Panther, now a member of the 5th Destroyer Flotilla, based at Devonport and which consisted of destroyers in commission with nucleus crews, was docked for repair of a propeller damaged in a collision with Yarmouth Pier.

On 30 August 1912 the Admiralty directed all destroyers were to be grouped into classes designated by letters based on contract speed and appearance. As a four-funneled 30-knotter destroyer, Panther was assigned to the B class. In 1912, older destroyers were organised into Patrol Flotillas, with Panther being part of the 7th Flotilla, based at Devonport, in March 1913.

In July 1914, shortly before the Irish Volunteers carried out the Howth gun-running, the Panther was sent to Dublin Bay to guard against such a measure. Bulmer Hobson told a colleague "in strict confidence" that an arms landing was planned for Waterford, in the south of the country, hoping that the news would leak to the authorities. The Panther duly sailed south, and the way was left clear for the operation at Howth to proceed. Panther remained part of the 7th Flotilla on the eve of the First World War in July 1914.

At the outbreak of war, the 7th Flotilla was redeployed to the Humber River for operations off the East coast of Britain. Duties of the flotilla were to prevent enemy ships from carrying out minelaying or torpedo attacks in the approaches to ports on the East coast, and to prevent raids by enemy ships. Panther remained part of the 7th Flotilla in August 1917, but in September that year was listed as part of the local defence flotilla for the Nore.  Panther was still listed as part of the Nore local defence Flotilla at the start of March 1918, but joined the 6th Destroyer Flotilla, part of the Dover Patrol on 23 March 1918. Panther remained part of the 6th Destroyer Flotilla in November 1918 and was under repair at the end of the war on 11 November that month.

Panther was sold for scrap on 7 June 1920.

Pennant numbers

References

Bibliography
 
 
 
 
 
 
 
 
 
 
 
 
 
 
 
 

 

Earnest-class destroyers
Ships built on the River Mersey
1897 ships
B-class destroyers (1913)
World War I destroyers of the United Kingdom